Altsys Corporation was a Texas-based software company founded by James R. Von Ehr II. It was an early Apple Macintosh developer and publisher.

Three major products from Altsys for PC / Macintosh and NeXT were:
Fontographer for Windows and Mac OS - font editor
Font-O-Matic for Windows - font transformer
Virtuoso for NeXTSTEP/OPENSTEP and Solaris - vector editor (a version was announced, advertised and demonstrated for Windows NT, but never released)

Altsys' best known product was basically a rebranded Virtuoso licensed to Aldus Corporation under the FreeHand name, was a vector drawing program that competed with Adobe Illustrator. It was published for many years, originally only on the Macintosh, then also for Microsoft Windows. When Aldus was acquired by Adobe, the licensing agreement that Altsys had with Aldus precluded FreeHand from being part of the deal, so the publishing rights reverted to Altsys. Altsys also published Metamorphosis for Macintosh, a font utility.

Altsys was acquired by Macromedia in January, 1995. Von Ehr became a major Macromedia shareholder and joined the Macromedia board of directors.

References

External links
Altsys Metamorphosis Apple Inc. support article, circa 1990
Softbase - lists whole Altsys software line for Windows

Macintosh software companies